Gone Are the Days may refer to:

 Gone Are the Days!, a 1963 film starring Ossie Davis
 "Gone Are the Days", a track from the 2008 album Liverpool 8, written by Ringo Starr
 "Gone Are the Days", a 2021 song by Kygo featuring James Gillespie
 Gone Are the Days (novel), a 2016 semi-autobiographical book by Gaurav Sharma
 Gone Are the Days (2018 film), a 2018 film starring Lance Henriksen

See also
 Gone Are the Dayes, a 1984 American made-for-television crime comedy film